Prnjavor is a common South Slavic placename, meaning "village on a monastery's property". It can refer to the following places:

Bosnia and Herzegovina
 Prnjavor, Bosnia and Herzegovina, a town and municipality in northern Bosnia and Herzegovina
 Prnjavor, Bihać, village near Bihać
 Prnjavor (Kalesija), village near Kalesija
 Prnjavor, Vitez, a village near Vitez
 Prnjavor Veliki, village near Doboj
 Prnjavor Mali (Doboj), village near Doboj
 Prnjavor Mali (Banja Luka), village near Banjaluka

Croatia
 Laze Prnjavor, near Požega

Montenegro
 Prnjavor, Plav, village near Plav

Serbia
 Prnjavor (Batočina), a village near Batočina
 Prnjavor (Trstenik), a village near Trstenik
 Prnjavor (Gornji Milanovac), a village near Gornji Milanovac
 Prnjavor (Belgrade), a suburban settlement of Belgrade
 Bešenovački Prnjavor, near Irig
 Ivkovački Prnjavor, near Jagodina
 Jošanički Prnjavor, near Jagodina
 Krušedol Prnjavor, near Irig
 Kalenićki Prnjavor, near Rekovac
 Mačvanski Prnjavor, a village near Šabac